Town Creek is a town in Lawrence County, Alabama, United States, and is included in the Decatur Metropolitan Area, as well as the Huntsville-Decatur Combined Statistical Area. It incorporated in March 1875. Since 1920, it has been the second largest town in Lawrence County after Moulton.

History
Town Creek was established in the first half of the 19th century, and was originally known as "Jonesboro" after an early settler, William Jones.  It incorporated in 1875.

Town Creek has one site listed on the National Register of Historic Places, the Goode-Hall House, to the north of town.

Geography
Town Creek is located at  (34.671518, -87.408311).  The town is concentrated around the intersection of U.S. Route 72 and State Route 101, southeast of Muscle Shoals and northwest of Decatur.  The town of Courtland lies just to the east.  State Route 101 connects Town Creek with Wheeler Dam, which spans the Tennessee River several miles to the north.

Demographics

At the 2000 census there were  people, 514 households, and 355 families in the town. The racial makeup of the town was 60.86% White, 34.21% Black or African American, 1.89% Native American, 0.16% Asian, 1.97% from other races, and 0.90% from two or more races. 3.62% of the population were Hispanic or Latino of any race.
Of the 514 households 35.8% had children under the age of 18 living with them, 44.4% were married couples living together, 21.4% had a female householder with no husband present, and 30.9% were non-families. 30.2% of households were one person and 13.4% were one person aged 65 or older. The average household size was 2.37 and the average family size was 2.93.

The age distribution was 28.5% under the age of 18, 9.1% from 18 to 24, 27.1% from 25 to 44, 21.2% from 45 to 64, and 14.0% 65 or older. The median age was 34 years. For every 100 females, there were 84.0 males. For every 100 females age 18 and over, there were 73.8 males.

Males had a median income of  versus  for females. About 20.1% of families and 23.3% of the population were below the poverty line, including 33.4% of those under age 18 and 18.5% of those age 65 or over.

2010 census
The racial makeup of the town was 52.4% White, 36.0% Black or African American, 2.1% Native American, 0.1% Asian, 4.4% from other races, and 5.1% from two or more races. 6.5% of the population were Hispanic or Latino of any race.
Of the 449 households 30.3% had children under the age of 18 living with them, 39.6% were married couples living together, 23.2% had a female householder with no husband present, and 32.3% were non-families. 29.4% of households were one person and 10.6% were one person aged 65 or older. The average household size was 2.45 and the average family size was 3.02.

The age distribution was 27.6% under the age of 18, 9.8% from 18 to 24, 22.8% from 25 to 44, 26.5% from 45 to 64, and 13.2% 65 or older. The median age was 37.1 years. For every 100 females, there were 84.3 males. For every 100 females age 18 and over, there were 87.1 males.

Males had a median income of  versus  for females. About 32.5% of families and 35.5% of the population were below the poverty line, including 44.4% of those under age 18 and 36.7% of those age 65 or over.

2020 census

As of the 2020 United States census, there were 1,052 people, 380 households, and 265 families residing in the city.

Notable people
 Rilous Carter, vice president of Disney's Epcot
 John Douglas, former NBA player
 Chris Goode, former NFL player
 Kerry Goode, former NFL running back
 Don Jones, NFL player 
 Antonio Langham, former NFL player 
 Kalvin Pearson, NFL Free Agent
 Bob Penchion, former NFL player
 Mack Vickery, Nashville songwriter, singer, musician, and Alabama Music Hall of Fame Inductee 2003. Born in Town Creek.
 Ali-Ollie Woodson, former Temptation (born in Detroit, but grew up in Town Creek)

References

External links

Towns in Lawrence County, Alabama
Decatur metropolitan area, Alabama
Towns in Alabama
Huntsville-Decatur, AL Combined Statistical Area